Benjamin T. Lobb  (born September 10, 1976) is a Canadian politician, who has represented the federal riding of Huron-Bruce in the House of Commons since 2008.  He is a member of the Conservative Party of Canada.

Early life
Ben was born and raised in Clinton, Ontario. He attended Lee University in Cleveland, Tennessee where he earned his B.Sc. in business administration.

Prior to being elected, Lobb worked in the Finance Department for D2L and also at Wescast Industries in Wingham, Ontario.

Political career
Lobb was first elected to the Canadian House of Commons in 2008 and has subsequently been re-elected in 2011, 2015, 2019, and 2021. Since first being elected, Lobb has served on a number of committees, including as Chair of the Standing Committee on Health. Lobb was named the Shadow Minister for Digital Government on October 13, 2022 by Conservative Leader Pierre Poilievre. 

In February 2021, Lobb was the sole Conservative MP to vote in favour of an NDP-proposed motion to take a first step towards developing a national pharmacare system. The bill, proposed by Peter Julian, would have established the conditions for federal financial contributions to provincial drug insurance plans.

In the 44th Parliament, Lobb has received support for his Private Member's Bill, C-234 also known as An Act to amend the Greenhouse Gas Pollution Pricing Act. Lobb's Bill seeks to remove the carbon tax off propane and natural gas for agriculture functions such as heating livestock barns and drying grains. The Bill is currently in Third Reading in the House of Commons.

Each summer, Lobb runs a minor baseball camp for youth in his riding to foster their skills development in the sport. The two-day camps in Clinton and Kincardine regularly have a headlining instructor who previously played in the MLB.

Electoral record

References

External links
Ben Lobb

1976 births
Members of the House of Commons of Canada from Ontario
Conservative Party of Canada MPs
Living people
Lee University alumni
21st-century Canadian politicians
People from Bruce County